Nationality words link to articles with information on the nation's poetry or literature (for instance, Irish or France).

Events

Works published

 Anonymous, The Phoeix Nest, anthology with poems by Thomas Lodge, Nicholas Breton, Sir Walter Ralegh and others; three elegies on Sir Philip Sidney, the "Phoenix" of the title, open the volume
 Barnabe Barnes, Parthenophil and Parthenophe, contains sonnets, madrigals, elegies and odes
 Anthony Chute, Beauty Dishonoured, written under the title of Shore's Wife
 Henry Constable, written but unpublished at this time
 Michael Drayton, Idea: the  garland, Fashioned in nine eglogs
 Giles Fletcher, the Elder, published anonymously, Licia, or Poemes of Love
 Robert Henryson, published anonymously, The Testament of Cresseid, first appeared in Thynne's edition of Chaucer's works in 1532
 Thomas Lodge, 
 Henry Lok, Sundry Christian Passions Contained in Two Hundred Sonnets (see also Ecclesiastes 1597)
 Thomas Morely, Cazonets; or, Little Short Songs to Three Voyces verse and music (see also Cazonets 1597)
 George Peele, The Honour of the Garter
 William Shakespeare, Venus and Adonis, probably the author's first published work and printed from his own manuscript; in the author's lifetime his most frequently reprinted work (second edition, 1594)
 Torquato Tasso, a rewriting of the author's  of 1581, Italy

Births
Death years link to the corresponding "[year] in poetry" article:
 April 3 – George Herbert (died 1633), Welsh poet, orator and priest
 June 24 – Abraham von Franckenberg (died 1652), German mystic, author, poet and hymn-writer
Also:
 Barten Holyday (died 1661), English clergyman, author and poet

Deaths
Birth years link to the corresponding "[year] in poetry" article:
 January 12 – Amadis Jamyn (born 1538), French poet
 August 19 – Antonio Veneziano (born 1543), Italian poet who wrote in the Sicilian language
 May 30 – Christopher Marlowe (born 1564), English playwright, poet and translator; murdered at Deptford
Also:
 Jeong Cheol, who wrote under the pen names "Gyeham" and "Songgang" (born 1536), Korean statesman and poet
 Abraham Fraunce (born between 1558 and 1560), English poet
 Judah Moscato  (born 1530), Italian rabbi, poet and philosopher
 Maciej Stryjkowski (born 1547), Polish-Lithuanian historian, writer and poet
 Xu Wei (born 1521), Chinese painter, poet and dramatist

See also

 Poetry
 16th century in poetry
 16th century in literature
 Dutch Renaissance and Golden Age literature
 Elizabethan literature
 English Madrigal School
 French Renaissance literature
 Renaissance literature
 Spanish Renaissance literature
 University Wits

Notes

16th-century poetry
Poetry